Ó Sé is a surname of Irish origin. People with name include:

Dáithí Ó Sé, Irish television personality
Darragh Ó Sé, Irish sportsman
Maidhc Dainín Ó Sé, Irish language writer and musician 
Marc Ó Sé, Irish sportsman
Mícheál Ó Sé, Irish sportsman
Páidí Ó Sé (1955-2012), Irish footballer
Tomás Ó Sé, Irish sportsman

See also 

 O'Shea or O Shea - common anglicisations of this Irish surname

Irish-language masculine surnames